Elections to Dumfries and Galloway Council were held on 3 May 2007 the same day as the other Scottish local government elections and the Scottish Parliament general election. The election was the first one using 13 new wards created as a result of the Local Governance (Scotland) Act 2004, each ward will elect three or four councillors using the single transferable vote system form of proportional representation. The new wards replace 47 single-member wards which used the plurality (first past the post) system of election.

The Conservatives increased their number of seats by seven to 18, the SNP increased by five to 10. 27 of the people elected had not been councillors previously.

Election results
The votes and percentage of vote share are based on first preference votes.

Ward results

Stranraer and North Rhins (3 seats)

Wigtown West (3 seats)

Mid Galloway (3 seats)

Dee (3 seats)

Castle Douglas and Glenkens (3 seats)

Abbey (4 seats)

North West Dumfries (4 seats)

Mid and Upper Nithsdale (4 seats)

Lochar (4 seats)

Nith (4 seats)

Annandale South (4 seats)

Annandale North (4 seats)

Annandale East (4 seats)

By-Elections since 3 May 2007
On 1 May 2008, a by-election was held to fill the seat vacated by Bruce Hodgson who had resigned. Michael John Thomson retained the seat for the Conservative Party.

On 16 June 2011, a by-election was held to fill the seat vacated by Michael John Thomson who had resigned. Tom McAughtrie won the seat for the Labour Party.

References

2007
2007 Scottish local elections